The 2012 European Mountain Running Championships were held on 7 July at Pamukkale in Denizli, Turkey. They were that year's area championships for mountain running, held by the European Athletic Association in conjunction with the Turkish Athletic Federation. The competition featured four races, with senior and junior races for both men and women. A total of 163 runners from 21 nations started the competition.

The men's race was 12.2 km long and featured an ascent of 700 m. The women's and junior men's races were 8.3 km long comprising a rise of 470 m. The junior women's race was 4.4 km over a hill of 240 m.

Ahmet Arslan from Turkey took his sixth consecutive men's title, while Swiss Monika Furholz won the gold medal in senior women's category. Italian senior men's and British senior women's teams were the champions. In the junior men's category, Turkish Ahmet Özrek became the champion. Annabel Mason from United Kingdom was the gold medalist in junior women's race. Turkish junior men's and junior women's teams took the gold medals in team ranking.

The event was dominated by the host nation Turkey, which won in total eight medals (four gold, three silver and one bronze) in six categories. It was the senior women's race, at which Turkey was not able to win any medal.

Results

Men

Totals: 49 starters

Women

Totals: 47

Junior men

Totals: 39 starters

Junior women

Totals: 28 starters

Medal table

Participation
A total of 21 nations had athletes, which took part in the 2012 Championships.

References

European Mountain Running Championships
European Mountain Running Championships
International athletics competitions hosted by Turkey
Sport in Denizli